The  was a political party in Japan. It was founded in January 1929 by Mizutani Chozaburo, a former associate of the Labour-Farmer Party leader Oyama Ikuo. Mizutani criticized Oyama Ikuo for being too open towards a merger with the centrist sectors of the socialist movement. The Labour-Farmer Masses Party was largely confined to Kyoto. The party was one of the founders of the United Proletarian Party Front in 1929.

After the 1930 election the party changed its mind regarding unification with the other socialist groups and the party. The party merged with the Tokyo Proletarian Party, forming the National Conference for a United Proletarian Party which in turn merged with other parties on July 20, 1930, founding the National Masses Party.

References 

Defunct political parties in Japan
Political parties disestablished in 1930
Political parties established in 1929
Socialist parties in Japan
1929 establishments in Japan
1930 disestablishments in Japan